Diuris luteola, commonly called the northern doubletail, is a species of orchid which is endemic to Queensland. It has a single linear leaf at its base and up to six pale yellow flowers with a few brown markings. It grows in shallow, stony soil on tablelands in eastern parts of the state.

Description
The petals are more or less erect, spread apart from each other with an elliptic to egg-shaped blade with the narrower end towards the base. Flowering occurs from July to September.

Taxonomy and naming
Diuris luteola was first formally described in 1991 by David Jones and Bruce Gray from a specimen collected on the Atherton Tableland near Herberton and the description was published in Australian Orchid Research. The specific epithet (luteola) is a Latin word meaning "yellowish", referring to the colour of the flowers of this species.

Distribution and habitat
The northern doubletail grows in shallow soil in grassy forest from Mount Windsor adjacent to the Daintree National Park to the Blackdown Tableland.

References

External links
 Images of D. luteola

luteola
Endemic orchids of Australia
Orchids of Queensland
Plants described in 1991